Amuru is a town in the Amuru woreda of the Horo Guduru Welega Zone, in the Oromia Region of Ethiopia. 

The Amuru woreda (district) that is known for its production of teff, barley, maize and other cereal crops.

Location
Amuru is located approximately 392 km northwest of Addis Ababa.
Amuru is a district located in Horro Guduruu wallaggaa zone Oromiya region. Oborra is its a town of the district. Agamsa was also other town of the district which isfound in west  of Amuru district.
Amuru is a place were first Christian missionary gospel preacher started in the history of Ethiopian phentakostal Christianity. Father Rorro Qare and Roro Waxa was among  1960`s teacher of the gospel preacher in history of Christianity. Also, Amuru have also the communities of other religion followers of orthodox Christianity and Muslims believers.

References

Amuru (woreda)
Populated places in the Oromia Region